= Parakal =

Parackal parackal
- Village
- Country: India
- State: Kerala
- District: Kottayam
- Talukas: Parakal

Languages
- Time zone: UTC+5:30 (IST)
- PIN: 506164
- Telephone code: 08713

Parakal is a village in Kottayam district in the state of Kerala in India.

== Panchayats ==
Meenachil Thalul, Kummanam
